100 Days is a 2001 drama film directed by Nick Hughes and produced by Hughes and Eric Kabera. The film is a dramatization of events that happened during the 1994 genocide against Tutsi in Rwanda. The title of the film is a direct reference to the length of time that passed from the beginning of the genocide on 6 April until it ended in mid-July 1994.

The film was the first feature film made about the 1994 genocide and focuses on the life of a young, refugee Tutsi girl and her attempts to find safety while the genocide is taking place. It was shot at locations where the Rwandan Genocide actually occurred.

Cast:
Eric Bridges Twahirwa,
Cleophas Kabasita, 
Davis Kagenza, 
Mazimpaka Kennedy, 
Davis Kwizera, 
David Mulwa, 
Didier Ndengeyintwali, 
Denis Nsanzamahoro, 
Justin Rusandazangabo

Notes

External links
 
 Center for International Development, Harvard University (Vivid Features film screening press release)
 Official Eric Kabera website

2001 films
British drama films
2001 drama films
English-language Rwandan films
Rwandan genocide films
2000s English-language films
Rwandan drama films
2000s British films